Atascadero (Spanish for "Mire") is a city in San Luis Obispo County, California, about equidistant from Los Angeles and San Francisco on U.S. Route 101. Atascadero is part of the San Luis Obispo-Paso Robles metropolitan statistical area, which encompasses the extents of the county. Atascadero is farther inland than most other cities in the county, and as a result, usually experiences warmer, drier summers, and cooler winters than other nearby cities such as San Luis Obispo and Pismo Beach. The main freeway through town is U.S. 101. The nearby State Routes 41 and 46 provide access to the Pacific Coast and the Central Valley of California.

Founded by E. G. Lewis in 1913, the city grew to 29,773 people as of 2020. Atascadero State Hospital is located in the city.

History 

The Spanish word  loosely means "bog" or "mire", from the verb , which means "to become stuck or hindered". On the other hand, in the Obispeño language, the site was named , which translates into a "place of much water".

The area was originally home to the Chumash and Salinan Native Americans. Between 1769 and 1823, the Spanish Franciscans established 21 missions along the California coast, including the nearby Mission San Miguel Arcángel and Mission San Luis Obispo de Tolosa. In 1821, Mexico won its independence from Spain, and California became the Mexican province of Nueva California (later Alta California). In 1833, the Mexican government secularized the mission lands. Mexican governor Juan Alvarado granted Rancho Atascadero to Trifon Garcia in 1842, and Pio Pico granted Pedro Estrada Rancho Asuncion in 1845.

Edward Gardner Lewis, a magazine publisher from the East, founded Atascadero in 1913 as a utopian, planned colony. He had previously created such a community at University City, Missouri. After purchasing the Atascadero Ranch in 1912, Lewis put together a group of investors, paid J.H. Henry , and celebrated acquisition of the ranch on July 4, 1913. As investors came to homestead the land that they had bought with their down payments, the area was transformed into a "tent city", with tents situated on land now occupied by Century Plaza and Bank of America. Lewis employed the services of experts in agriculture, engineering and city planning to develop his dream colony for the anticipated 30,000 residents. In 1914, the land was surveyed and subdivided. Beginning with the 1914 deed, sale of all land in Atascadero was restricted to only whites. Thousands of acres of orchards were planted, a water system was installed, and construction began on an  road (now Highway 41 west) through the Santa Lucia Mountains to the ocean (Morro Bay), where Lewis built cottages and a beachfront hotel called the Cloisters.

The first civic building in Atascadero, the Atascadero Press Building, had the first rotogravure presses west of Chicago. Lewis then published the Atascadero News newspaper and the Illustrated Review, a photo/news magazine. The centerpiece of Lewis' planned community was an Italian Renaissance-style building, which was the home to Atascadero City Hall and the Museum until it was damaged in the 2003 earthquake. After significant upgrades and renovations, the building was reopened in August 2013. Built between 1914 and 1918 with bricks made from local clay, this unique and beautiful building has become one of California's Historical Landmarks (No. 958).

Founded in 1913 by Edward Gardner Lewis and incorporated in 1979, the Atascadero Colony as it was known at the time was originally envisioned as a model community. Little evidence of Atascadero's original architecture and urban design remain, as historic buildings and homes have been torn down to make way for more modern developments and the Sunken Gardens bisected by U.S. Route 101. One of the few surviving examples of original urban design can be found, however, in the Rotunda Building located near the junior high school on Palma Avenue in the Sunken Gardens public park. Designed by Walter D. Bliss of San Francisco, construction was completed in 1918 at a cost of $180,000. It was the headquarters for the Atascadero Colony, built of reinforced concrete and locally produced brick, it had also served as a private school for boys, a veteran's memorial building, and county offices. At 6500 Palma Ave., this building was purchased by San Luis Obispo County in the 1950s as a Memorial Building. The building housed the county library, Atascadero Historical Social Museum and then the city offices following incorporation in 1979. The historic city hall is adorned with a  dome atop the third story, originally intended to house the library. The building was designated a California Historical Landmark. The city hall was damaged by the magnitude 6.5 San Simeon earthquake on the morning of December 22, 2003.

Another example of Atascadero's early architecture is the Carlton Hotel, built in 1929, located just west of the Sunken Gardens on El Camino Real, the city's main commercial street. Vacant since 1987, the building was rejuvenated, costing an estimated $15 million and completed in 2003.

The Skytherm house was developed in Atascadero. This private home pioneered solar powered cooling and heating using an integrated rooftop water system. Solar roof ponds are unique solar heating and cooling systems developed by Harold Hay in the 1960s. A basic system consists of a roof-mounted water bladder with a movable insulating cover. This system can control heat exchange between interior and exterior environments by covering and uncovering the bladder between night and day. When heating is a concern the bladder is uncovered during the day allowing sunlight to warm the water bladder and store heat for evening use. When cooling is a concern the covered bladder draws heat from the building's interior during the day and is uncovered at night to radiate heat to the cooler atmosphere. The Skytherm house in Atascadero uses a prototype roof pond for heating and cooling.

Geography
Atascadero is geographically the largest city in San Luis Obispo County. Atascadero is near the Carrizo Plain.

Climate
Atascadero experiences a hot-summer Mediterranean (Köppen: Csa) climate, with a high degree of diurnal temperature variation.

Demographics

2010
The 2010 United States Census reported that Atascadero had a population of 28,310. The racial makeup of Atascadero was 24,457 (86.4%) White, 585 (2.1%) African American, 295 (1.0%) Native American, 685 (2.4%) Asian, 57 (0.2%) Pacific Islander, 1,205 (4.3%) from other races, and 1,026 (3.6%) from two or more races. Hispanic or Latino of any race were 4,429 persons (15.6%).

The Census reported that 26,986 people (95.3% of the population) lived in households, 224 (0.8%) lived in non-institutionalized group quarters, and 1,100 (3.9%) were institutionalized.

There were 10,737 households, out of which 3,428 (31.9%) had children under the age of 18 living in them, 5,681 (52.9%) were opposite-sex married couples living together, 1,185 (11.0%) had a female householder with no husband present, 538 (5.0%) had a male householder with no wife present. There were 661 (6.2%) unmarried opposite-sex partnerships, and 112 (1.0%) same-sex married couples or partnerships. 2,497 households (23.3%) were made up of individuals, and 879 (8.2%) had someone living alone who was 65 years of age or older. The average household size was 2.51. There were 7,404 families (69.0% of all households); the average family size was 2.94.

The population was spread out, with 6,068 people (21.4%) under the age of 18, 2,280 people (8.1%) aged 18 to 24, 7,244 people (25.6%) aged 25 to 44, 9,032 people (31.9%) aged 45 to 64, and 3,686 people (13.0%) who were 65 years of age or older. The median age was 41.0 years. For every 100 females, there were 103.2 males. For every 100 females age 18 and over, there were 103.5 males.

The homeowner vacancy rate was 2.2%; the rental vacancy rate was 5.8%. 17,470 people (61.7% of the population) lived in owner-occupied housing units and 9,516 people (33.6%) lived in rental housing units.

2000
According to the 2000 census, there were 26,411 people, 9,531 households, and 6,814 families residing in the city. The racial makeup of the city was 88.79% White, 2.36% African American, 0.94% Native American, 1.27% Asian, 0.11% Pacific Islander, 3.19% from other races, and 3.34% from two or more races. Hispanic or Latino of any race were 10.54% of the population.

There were 9,531 households, of which 35.9% had children under the age of 18 living with them, 55.5% were married couples living together, 11.4% had a female householder with no husband present, and 28.5% were non-families. 22.0% of all households were made up of individuals, and 8.1% had someone living alone who was 65 years of age or older. The average household size was 2.62 and the average family size was 3.05.

In the city, the population was spread out, with 25.6% under the age of 18, 8.3% from 18 to 24, 28.8% from 25 to 44, 25.8% from 45 to 64, and 11.5% who were 65 years of age or older. The median age was 38 years. For every 100 females, there were 106.2 males. For every 100 females age 18 and over, there were 105.4 males.

The median income for a household in the city was $48,725, and the median income for a family was $55,009. Males had a median income of $41,692 versus $29,740 for females. The per capita income for the city was $20,029. About 6.9% of families and 9.0% of the population were below the poverty line, including 10.7% of those under age 18 and 6.3% of those age 65 or over.

Government
Atascadero is a general law city, governed by a city council. The council consists of five members, elected at-large: a mayor (who serves a two-year term) and four council members (who serve four-year terms).

Transportation

Freeways and highways 
Atascadero is at the intersection of U.S. 101 and State Route 41, halfway between Los Angeles and San Francisco on U.S. 101 with direct eastbound access to the San Joaquin Valley and Interstate 5. Atascadero is serviced by one freeway and one highway:

 U.S. Route 101 (US 101) is the most heavily used road transportation arterial for the city of Atascadero and serves as its north–south gateway. US 101 runs in a north–south direction and bisects the city (along with the Salinas River) into western and eastern portions. Traveling northward from the city, US 101 runs up to San Jose, San Francisco, and continues on along the coast up through Northern California, Oregon, and finally ends near Olympia in Washington state. Traveling southward from the city, US 101 heads down to San Luis Obispo, Santa Barbara, and on to Los Angeles, ending at the East Los Angeles Interchange.
 State Route 41 (SR 41) is a major north–south highway in the State of California and runs in a northeast–southwest direction through the city. Traveling southbound, SR 41 leaves the city and gradually climbs up and over the Santa Lucia Coastal Range, where it then quickly descends and meets the Pacific Ocean, in the city of Morro Bay at its southern terminus where it meets SR 1 (the Pacific Coast Highway). Traveling northbound, SR 41 leaves the city and intersects with SR 229. About  later, it crosses SR 33 and eventually Interstate 5 in the Central Valley before continuing toward Fresno.

Rail transportation
The Union Pacific Coast Line between Burbank (Los Angeles) and San Jose runs through Atascadero, carrying Amtrak's Coast Starlight passenger train through the city. Amtrak provides connecting  Amtrak Thruway Motorcoach service to the Atascadero transit center, with the closest passenger railroad stations being Paso Robles station and San Luis Obispo station.

Airports
San Luis Obispo County Regional Airport (IATA: SBP, ICAO: KSBP, FAA LID: SBP), also known as McChesney Field, is an airport located in San Luis Obispo serving San Luis Obispo County. The airport is mostly used for general aviation, but is also served by three commercial airlines.
Located just south of the City of San Luis Obispo, the San Luis Obispo County Regional Airport serves areas as far north as southern Monterey County and as far south as northern Santa Barbara County. The airport is also home to full-service general aviation and corporate facilities.

Education

The Atascadero Unified School District contains seven elementary schools, two middle/junior high schools, two high schools, one college, and five or more miscellaneous school sites and programs.

Elementary schools
Monterey Road Elementary (K-5)
San Benito Road Elementary (K-5)
Santa Rosa Road Elementary (K-5)
San Gabriel Road Elementary (K-5)
Atascadero Fine Arts Academy (4-8)
North County Christian School (K-6) (Not in Atascadero Unified)
Santa Margarita Elementary (K-6) (In Atascadero Unified School District, but outside of city limits)
Creston Elementary (K-6) (In Atascadero Unified School District, but outside of city limits)
Carissa Plains Elementary (K-6) (In Atascadero Unified School District, but outside of city limits)

Middle schools 
Atascadero Middle School (6-8) 
Atascadero Fine Arts Academy (4-8) 
North County Christian School (7-8)

High schools 
Atascadero High School (9-12)
Paloma Creek High School (9-12)
North County Christian School (9-12)

Colleges
San Joaquin Valley College (SJVC) - Atascadero Campus

Sports and recreation
Atascadero Colony Park Community Recreational Center

In addition to fishing and swimming, the lake provides ample room for waterskiing, wakeboarding, jetskiing, and other water-related activities.

Parks
Apple Valley Park
Colony Park
Atascadero Lake Park
Joy Park (all-inclusive, fenced park)
Paloma Creek Park
A-town Park (ramps and features for scooters and skateboards)
Stadium Park
Sunken Gardens
Heilmann Regional Park
Chalk Mt. park and Golf course
Dove Creek Park 
"Little" Park

Facilities

Atascadero City Hall
The Atascadero City Hall, also known as the Rotunda, was constructed in 1918 per the founder E.G. Lewis's vision for the Utopian community of Atascadero. In 2003, the historic building was damaged by the magnitude 6.6 San Simeon earthquake. The city took over a bowling alley for use as a temporary city hall while the building underwent extensive renovations and retrofitting. In August 2013, after ten years of closure, the original city hall building was reopened and remains in service.

Atascadero Fire Department
The Atascadero City Fire Department is an "all risk" fire department that responds to emergencies such as medical aid, structure fires, wildland fires, vehicle traffic collisions, hazardous materials incidents, technical rescues and public service assists. The fire department operates from two fire stations.

Atascadero Police Department

Colony Park Community Center
The  community center includes a full-size gymnasium, teen center, café, arts and crafts center, dance room, conference rooms and restrooms.

Paramedic and ambulance services
San Luis Ambulance and Atascadero Fire Department.

In popular culture
Atascadero is the setting for the novel Pay It Forward.

In the movie The Grifters (1990) Atascadero is mentioned as the place a former partner-in-crime of Myra Langtry, played by Annette Bening, has retired to — insinuating that he became an inmate in Atascadero State Hospital for the criminally insane.

The 1990 film My Blue Heaven uses the City Hall exterior to depict a courthouse and the police department lobby (which was in the City Hall at the time) to film Steve Martin's character signing paperwork after being bailed out of jail.

In the 2017 Netflix series Godless, main character Roy Goode's older brother lives in Atascadero.

References

External links

Visitor website
State Mental Hospital Web Site
Atascadero News est. 1916.
Atascadero Land Preservation Society

 
Cities in San Luis Obispo County, California
Incorporated cities and towns in California
Salinas River (California)
Santa Lucia Range
Populated places established in 1913
Populated places established in 1979
1913 establishments in California
1979 establishments in California